The South Seas Island Resort Women's Pro Classic was a tournament for professional female tennis players played on outdoor hard courts. The event was classified as a $50,000 ITF Women's Circuit tournament and was held in Captiva Island, United States, in 2013 and 2014.

Past finals

Singles

Doubles

External links 
 
 ITF search

ITF Women's World Tennis Tour
Hard court tennis tournaments in the United States
Defunct tennis tournaments in the United States
Recurring sporting events established in 2013
Recurring sporting events disestablished in 2014
Defunct tennis tournaments in Florida
2013 establishments in Florida
2014 disestablishments in Florida
Captiva Island